For information on all Lamar University sports, see Lamar Cardinals and Lady Cardinals

The 2020–21 Lamar Cardinals basketball team represented Lamar University during the 2020–21 NCAA Division I men's basketball season. The Cardinals were led by seventh-year head coach Tic Price and played their home games at the Montagne Center in Beaumont, Texas. This season was the Cardinals' last as members of the Southland Conference; Lamar is one of four schools, all from Texas, that will leave the Southland in July 2021 to join the Western Athletic Conference.

Previous season
The Cardinals finished the 2019–20 season 17–15, 10–10 in Southland play to finish in a three-way tie for sixth place. They defeated McNeese State in the first round of the Southland tournament and were set to face Nicholls in the second round before the tournament was cancelled amid the COVID-19 pandemic.

Roster

TV and radio media

All Lamar games will be broadcast on KLVI, also known as News Talk 560.

Live video of all home games (except those picked up by Southland Conference TV agreements) will be streamed on ESPN3.

Schedule and results

|-
!colspan=12 style=| Non-conference regular season

|-
!colspan=12 style=| Southland regular season

|-
!colspan=12 style=| Southland Tournament

Source:

See also 
2020–21 Lamar Lady Cardinals basketball team

References

Lamar Cardinals basketball seasons
Lamar
Lamar Cardinals basketball
Lamar Cardinals basketball